Akhila (in Devanagari: अखिला ) is a Hindu/Sanskrit Indian given name, which means "everything" or "complete".

Akhilā means the consort of god Akhil who is Shiv.

Akhil (अखिल) when sub divided with essence of the base sanskrit here "A" अ means  (negative or deprived of) and "khil" खिल means uncultivated or unploughed land that is raw and untouched. It's a characteristic name of Shiv शिव and Akhilā (अखिला) his consort as his power (शक्ति) Shiva शिवा.

Thus the name Akhileshvara means the god of everything is Shiv and his consort is goddess Akhileshvari

Source- https://www.wisdomlib.org/

 Notable persons with the name include:
Akhila Kishore (born 1990), Indian actress
Akhila Sasidharan (born 1989), Indian actress and dancer
Akhila Srinivasan (born 1962), Indian businesswoman

See also 
Akhil (disambiguation)

References

Hindu given names
Indian feminine given names